The Men's trap pairs event of the 2010 Commonwealth Games took place on 8 October 2010, at the CRPF Campus.

Results

External links
Report

Shooting at the 2010 Commonwealth Games